Ilkka Pertti Juhani Laitinen (22 August 1962 – 29 September 2019) was a Finnish border guard officer, who served as the lieutenant general and the Chief of the Finnish Border Guard from 2018 to 2019. He was the first Executive Director of Frontex, the European Union’s border protection agency, from 2005 until 2014.

He served in the Finnish Border Guard in 1982 and since 1985. He rose to the rank of colonel in 2004 and held a wide variety of national and EU jobs. He was appointed as the first head of Frontex on 25 May 2005.

Laitinen retired from the Finnish Border Guard due to ill health on 31 August 2019. He died on 29 September 2019, aged 57, due to illness.

References

Finnish Ministry of the Interior: Press release Colonel Ilkka Laitinen appointed as Executive Director of the EU Borders Agency (2005-05-25)
Finnish Border Guard: Curriculum vitae of Ilkka Laitinen (in Finnish)
Frontex official site

 

1962 births
2019 deaths
People from Nurmes
Finnish military personnel
Finnish officials of the European Union
European Border and Coast Guard
People in border guards